Judge was a weekly satirical magazine published in the United States from 1881 to 1947. It was launched by artists who had seceded from its rival Puck. The founders included cartoonist James Albert Wales, dime novels publisher Frank Tousey and author George H. Jessop.

History and profile

The first printing of Judge was on October 29, 1881, during the Long Depression. It was 16 pages long and printed on quarto paper. While it did well initially, it soon had trouble competing with Puck.  William J. Arkell purchased the magazine in the middle 1880s. Arkell used his considerable wealth to persuade the cartoonists Eugene Zimmerman ("Zim") and Bernhard Gillam to leave Puck. A supporter of the Republican Party, Arkell persuaded his cartoonists to attack the Democratic administration of Grover Cleveland. With GOP aid, Judge boomed during the '80s and '90s, surpassing its rival publication in content and circulation. By the early 1890s, the circulation of the magazine reached 50,000.

Under the editorial leadership of Isaac Gregory, (1886–1901), Judge further allied with the Republican Party and supported the candidacy of William McKinley largely through the cartoons of cartoonists Victor Gillam and Grant E. Hamilton. Circulation for Judge was about 85,000 in the 1890s. By the 1900s, the magazine had become successful, reaching a circulation of 100,000 by 1912.
Edward Anthony was an editor in the early 1920s. Anthony was later co-author of Frank Buck's first two books, Bring 'em Back Alive and Wild Cargo.

Harold Ross was an editor of Judge between April 5 and August 2, 1924. He used the experience on the magazine to start his own in 1925, The New Yorker.

The success of The New Yorker, as well as the Great Depression, put pressure on Judge. It became a monthly in 1932 and ceased circulation in 1947.

Judge was resurrected in October 1953 as a 32-page weekly. David N. Laux was President and Publisher with Mabel Search as editorial director and Al Catalano as art director. Contributors included Arthur L. Lippman and Victor Lasky. There were sections with light essays on sport, golf, horse racing, radio, theater, television, bridge and current books, along with submissions from college magazines, a crossword puzzle, single-panel cartoons and humorous pieces. There were several political sections; one-liners, cartoons and longer essays with mostly a conservative bent, in a style foreshadowing Emmett Tyrrell of today's The American Spectator.

A collection of Judge and Puck cartoons dating from 1887–1900 is maintained by the Special Collections Reference Center of The George Washington University. The collection is located in GW's Estelle and Melvin Gelman Library and is open to researchers.

Gallery

References

External links 

 Judge archived issues at HathiTrust 
 Judge v094 n2429 (1928-05-19)
 Guide to the Samuel Halperin Puck and Judge Cartoon Collection, Special Collections Research Center, Estelle and Melvin Gelman Library, The George Washington University

1881 establishments in the United States
1947 disestablishments in the United States
Defunct magazines published in the United States
Humor magazines
Magazines disestablished in 1947
Magazines established in 1881
Magazines published in New York City
Monthly magazines published in the United States
Satirical magazines published in the United States
Weekly magazines published in the United States